The 1991 NCAA Rifle Championships were contested at the 11th annual competition to determine the team and individual national champions of NCAA co-ed collegiate rifle shooting in the United States. The championship was held at the United States Military Academy in West Point, New York.

Three-time defending champions West Virginia once again retained the team championship, finishing 61 points ahead of Alaska in the team standings. It was the Mountaineers' seventh overall national title.

The individual champions were, for the smallbore rifle, Soma Dutta (UTEP), and Ann-Marie Pfiffner (West Virginia), for the air rifle.

Qualification
Since there is only one national collegiate championship for rifle shooting, all NCAA rifle programs (whether from Division I, Division II, or Division III) were eligible. A total of six teams ultimately contested this championship.

Results
Scoring:  The championship consisted of 120 shots by each competitor in smallbore and 40 shots per competitor in air rifle.

Team title

Individual events

References

NCAA Rifle Championships
1991 in shooting sports
NCAA Rifle Championships
NCAA Rifle Championship